John Gordon Cooper KC (born 15 September 1958 in Wolverhampton) is a British barrister specialising in human rights and criminal law.  He is also a broadcaster and politician.  He is a member of the Bar of England and Wales, where he practises with '25 Bedford Row' and the Australian Bar. He has been chairman of the League Against Cruel Sports since 1996, and he was appointed honorary professor of law at Cardiff University in 2011.

He ran for the House of Commons as a candidate for the Labour Party in the 1987 election in North West Surrey and in the 1992 election in Amber Valley.  He was a councillor on Watford Borough Council from 1990 to 1994.

He is a member of '25 Bedford Row' Chambers in London. He specialises in cases of homicide and serious violence, serious fraud and drug offences.  He has also acted in cases such as the Jacintha Saldanha inquest, Duchess of Cambridge Prank Call case, the largest ever import of heroin in the UK, and represented Nicola Edgington during her murder trial.

In 2012, he successfully acted for Paul Chambers, in his appeal over the Twitter Joke Trial.

References

External links
 Official website
 - 25 Bedford Row Chambers profile

English King's Counsel
Members of the Middle Temple
People from Wolverhampton
1958 births
Living people
Labour Party (UK) councillors
Labour Party (UK) parliamentary candidates
21st-century King's Counsel
Councillors in Hertfordshire